Jamal Mallory McCree is an American actor. He is best known for his portrayal of Charlie Price in the ABC thriller Quantico and as Sekou Bah in the Showtime television series Homeland.

Biography

J. Mallory McCree is a native of Detroit, Michigan. After graduating from Rutgers University and earning a bachelor's degree from the Mason Gross School of the Arts, McCree moved to New York. Soon after, 
he booked roles in New York's premiere off-broadway houses such as Signature Theatre and Playwright's Horizons. After acquiring a strong background in theatre, McCree has broken through to film and television. He guest starred on shows such as Quantico, Law & Order, Blue Bloods, Code Black, Homeland and The Defenders as well as appearing in films such as Cloned, No One Asked Me and From Nowhere.

Personal life
He is engaged to fellow actor Angela Lewis.

Filmography

Film

Television

References

External links

Living people
1983 births
American male film actors
American male television actors
Male actors from Detroit
Mason Gross School of the Arts alumni